Desalvo is a metalcore band from Glasgow, Scotland, formed in 1998.

History
Desalvo were formed by Alex Grant, former PH Family and Idlewild bassist, former Stretchheads drummer Richie Dempsey, and Allan Stewart who then went on to also join Idlewild. Their original vocalist Fraser Lumsden, also of PH Family, left the band in 1999 and was replaced by former Stretchheads vocalist 'p6'. 

Desalvo split in 2011. In 2022 the band announced gig dates, their first in 11 years.
More writing and future shows are being planned.

Musical style
Desalvo was originally strongly influenced by US post-hardcore bands such as Helmet, but have later developed a more metallic and progressive sound akin to Converge. The band have also been compared to The Jesus Lizard. They have been described as "one of Scotland's most prominent sociopathic hardcore acts".

Kerrang! described their debut set Mood Poisoner''' as "one of the heaviest albums of the year", and said p6's singing "best resembles a dalek attempting to make chicken noises".

DiscographyMood Poisoner (2008, Rock Action Records)

References

External links

Band page on Rock Action Records
Robertson, Mark (2008) "Exposure - Desalvo", The List'', 18 September 2008 

Scottish rock music groups
Musical groups established in 1998
Rock Action Records artists